The year 1933 in science and technology involved some significant events, listed below.

Astronomy
 October 13 – The British Interplanetary Society is founded.
 Walter Baade and Fritz Zwicky invent the concept of the neutron star, a new type of celestial object, suggesting that supernovae might be created by the collapse of a normal star to form a neutron star.
 Sir Arthur Eddington publishes The Expanding Universe: Astronomy's 'Great Debate', 1900–1931 in Cambridge.
 Comedian Will Hay observes the periodic Great White Spot on Saturn from his private observatory in London.
 Fritz Zwicky postulates the existence of dark matter.

Chemistry
 Gilbert N. Lewis isolates the first sample of pure heavy water by electrolysis.
 Morris S. Kharasch and Frank R. Mayo propose that free radicals are responsible for anti-Markovnikov addition of hydrogen bromide to allyl bromide.

Earth sciences
 March 10 – Long Beach earthquake in Southern California: First recording of earthquake strong ground motions by an accelerograph network, installed in 1932 by the United States Coast and Geodetic Survey.

Mathematics
 Andrey Kolmogorov publishes Foundations of the Theory of Probability, laying the modern axiomatic foundations of probability theory.
 David Champernowne, while still a Cambridge undergraduate, publishes his work on the Champernowne constant in real numbers.
 Alfréd Haar introduces Haar measure.
 Jerzy Neyman and Egon Pearson publish the Neyman–Pearson lemma.
 Stanley Skewes discovers Skewes' number.

Physics
 September 12 – Leó Szilárd, waiting for a red light on Southampton Row in Bloomsbury (London), conceives the idea of the nuclear chain reaction.

Physiology and medicine
 April 3 – First attempted human kidney transplant, by Dr Yuri Voronoy in the Soviet city of Kherson; the recipient dies 2 days later due to incompatibility of blood type with the (cadaveric) donor.
 July 8 – English researchers Wilson Smith, Christopher Andrewes and Patrick Laidlaw report isolating a human influenza A virus and its transferability to ferrets.
 July 14 – Law for the Prevention of Hereditarily Diseased Offspring enacted in Nazi Germany allowing compulsory sterilization of citizens suffering from a list of alleged genetic disorders.
 Manfred Sakel begins to practice insulin shock therapy on psychiatric patients in Vienna.

Technology
 June – A research group at RCA headed by Vladimir K. Zworykin publicly launches the iconoscope, the first practical cathode ray tube television camera.
 June 26 – American Totalisator unveils its first tote board, the electronic pari-mutuel betting machine, at the Arlington Park race track near Chicago.

Organizations
 Museum of Science and Industry (Chicago) first opens to the public, as part of the Century of Progress Exposition.
 The Institute for Advanced Study opens at Princeton, New Jersey, attracting Albert Einstein, John von Neumann and Kurt Gödel.
 Sheffield Trades Historical Society (later South Yorkshire Industrial History Society) established in England.

Awards
 Nobel Prizes
 Physics – Erwin Schrödinger and Paul Dirac
 Chemistry – not awarded
 Physiology or Medicine – Thomas Hunt Morgan

Births
 January 6 – Oleg Makarov (died 2003), Soviet cosmonaut.
 January 18 – David Bellamy (died 2019), English botanist.
 March 9 – Sir David Weatherall (died 2018), English molecular geneticist.
 March 10 – Patricia Bergquist (died 2009), New Zealand scientist specializing in anatomy and taxonomy.
 March 23 – Philip Zimbardo, American social psychologist.
 April 14 – Yuri Oganessian, Russian nuclear physicist.
 May 22 – Chen Jingrun (died 1996), Chinese mathematician.
 July 9 – Oliver Sacks (died 2015), English-born neurologist.
 July 12 – Max Birnstiel (died 2014), Swiss molecular biologist.
 August 10 – Ed Posner (died 1993), American mathematician.
 August 15
 Stanley Milgram (died 1984), American social psychologist.
 Michael Rutter, English child psychiatrist.
 September 6 – Juliet Clutton-Brock (died 2015), English zooarchaeologist.
 September 10 – Yevgeny Khrunov (died 2000), Soviet cosmonaut.
 September 26 – Charles C. Conley (died 1984), American mathematician specializing in dynamical systems.
 October 2 – Sir John Gurdon, English developmental biologist, recipient of the Nobel Prize in Physiology or Medicine.
 October 9 – Sir Peter Mansfield (died 2017), English physicist, recipient of the Nobel Prize in Physiology or Medicine.
 November 1 – Dijen K. Ray-Chaudhuri, Bengali-born mathematician.
 November 4 – Sir Charles K. Kao (died 2018), Chinese electrical engineer and physicist, recipient of the Nobel Prize in Physics.
 December 22 – Thomas Stockham (died 2004), American electrical engineer and inventor
 December 23 – Akihito, ichthyologist and Emperor of Japan.

Deaths
 January 14 – Sir Robert Jones, 1st Baronet (born 1857), Welsh orthopaedic surgeon.
 May 22 – Sándor Ferenczi (born 1873), Hungarian psychoanalyst.
 June 14 – Ernest William Moir (born 1862), British civil engineer.
 September 25 – Paul Ehrenfest (born 1880), Austrian physicist and mathematician.
 October 29
 Albert Calmette (born 1863), French physician, bacteriologist and immunologist.
 Paul Painlevé (born 1863), mathematician and statesman, 62nd Prime Minister of France.
 November 3 – Pierre Paul Émile Roux (born 1853), French physician, bacteriologist and immunologist.
 December 8 – John Joly (born 1857), Irish physicist.

References

 
20th century in science
1930s in science